It's a Wonderful Life is a 2007 Hong Kong comedy film written, directed by and starring Ronald Cheng, who makes his directorial debut. The film co-stars Tony Leung, Vincent Kok, Alex Fong, Teresa Mo and Louisa So.

Plot
The Jade Emperor (Patrick Dunn) is offering a reward for a proposal plan to promote the economy of Heaven. When Thunder God (Ronald Cheng), who known for his cleverness, submits his proposal to the Jade Emperor, Thunder God's girlfriend, the Saint of Nine Heavens (Mia Yam), reveals that thirty years ago, Thunder God once descended to Earth and helped a chubby boy named Ding Don, helping him stay on the right path and not go astray. Thunder God thought he was going to be rewarded for this effort, but instead, the Saint of Nine Heavens tells him about a promise he made to the kid, that he will come forward to help the kid if he faces any difficulties. At this very moment, Ding Don (Vincent Kok), now grown up, is facing a death amulet. If Thunder God does not fulfill his commitment, it will be a disadvantage for him when campaigning for his proposal. Thunder God, who possess great strength in his magical powers, decides to fulfill his promise and descends to Earth and help Ding Don go through his crisis. However, the situation is not as simple as he imagined to be.

Ding Don is currently in his 30s, living with his beautiful wife, Cheng Choi (Louisa So), and younger brother-in-law, Cheng Wo (Alex Fong). Ding is a director of a department store and is often bullied by his superior, Pat Sau-kong (Tony Leung), while his brother-in-law have fallen in love with a gambling addict, Miki (Miki Yeung), resulting in a huge debt from loan sharks. The Saint of Nine Heavens also finds out from the Life and Death Collection book that on New Year's Eve, Ding's life will be in danger as Pat had hired assassins to kill Ding. When Thunder God attempts to protect Ding with magical powers, he does not know how to properly put spells, resulting in a large chaos.

Cast
Ronald Cheng as Thunder God (雷震子)
Tony Leung Ka-fai as Mr. Pat Sau-kong (畢秀鋼)
Vincent Kok as Ding Don (丁噹)
Alex Fong as Cheng Wo (鄭和)
Teresa Mo as Mo Ching-ching (毛程程), Pat's wife
Louisa So as Cheng Choi (鄭菜)
Cheung Tat-ming as Kong To-hoi (江道海), Cheng Wo's cousin
Amanda Strang as Broccoli (芥蘭)
Patrick Dunn as Jade Emperor (玉皇大帝)
Ken Lo as Earth God (土地公)
Mia Yam as Saint of Nine Heavens (九天玄女)
Kate Yeung as Ding Fong (丁芳), Don's younger sister
Miki Yeung as Miki (柔柔)
Chan Fai-hung as Fengshui Lau (風水劉)
Lam Chi-chung as Piggy God (豬八戒)
Danny Chan as Monkey God  (孫悟空)
Tin Kai-man as Frog (田雞)
Francis Ng as Ugly Kwan (靚坤) (cameo)
Kelly Chen as Goddess of Mercy (觀音) (cameo)
Kenny Bee as God of Prosperity (財神) (cameo)
Edmond Leung as Waiter (cameo)
Paco Wong as Jade Emperor's father
Fung Min-hun as Mainlander (大陸雞)
Alex Lam as Hung Yeh (洪爺)
Terence Tsui as Hung Chai (雄仔)
Yeung Lun as Frog's assistant
Hau Woon-ling as Old lady robbed outside of temple
Louis Yee as robber of old lady
Lee Chi-kit as robber of old lady
Ip Ho-wing
Ip Ho-kong
Lau Tin-wah as Kwan's gangster
Chiu Kwok-choi as Kwan's gangster
Hui Man-lung as Kid playing computer game
So Chun-kit as Kid playing computer game
Chan Kun-lam as Kid playing video game
Kylie Kwok as Darlene (墮lin)
Rainbow Yeung as Charlene (射lin)
Li Wang-hin as Department store urchin
Yeung Chi-tung as Department store urchin
Ho Yeung-wai as Dealer
Cheung Kam-cheung as Dealer
Choi Tak-kai as Dealer
Gladys Kwong as Department store female student
Tsang Kan-cheung as Northern Lion troupe member
Daniel Cheng as Ding Lik (丁力), Ding Don's son
Jackie Leung as Ding Ding (丁丁), Ding Don's daughter
Anita Jims as Tennis player
Annie Ng as Tennis player
Jason Cheung as Little Ding Don

Music

Theme song
All Wishes Come True (心想事成)
Composer: Mark Lui
Lyricist: Yan Kin-keung
Singer: Ronald Cheng, Tony Leung, Alex Fong, Edmond Leung, Vincent Kok

Insert theme
Having Courage (有種)
Composer: Chan Fai-young
Lyricist: Lin Xi
Singer: Ronald Cheng

Critical reception
Lau Kit of the South China Morning Post gave the film a positive review praising the performances of Tony Leung Ka-fai and Teresa Mo, while also praising Ronald Cheng's transition from lowbrow humour to offering comments of life.

References

External links

It's A Wonderful Life at Hong Kong Cinemagic

2007 films
2000s fantasy comedy films
Hong Kong fantasy comedy films
2000s Cantonese-language films
2007 directorial debut films
Films set in Hong Kong
Films shot in Hong Kong
2007 comedy films
2000s Hong Kong films